Laurence Nerbonne (born 24 March 1985) is a Canadian pop singer and artist from Quebec based in Montreal.

Life and career 
Originally from Gatineau, Quebec, Nerbonne performed with the band Hôtel Morphée before releasing XO, her debut album, in 2016.

She won the Juno Award for Francophone Album of the Year at the Juno Awards of 2017 for her album XO.

In addition to her Juno Award win, she won the 2016 SOCAN Songwriting Prize in the French-language division for the song "Rêves d’été".

Nerbonne is also a celebrated artist, using acrylics and primarily focussing on the human face. Nerbonne states "the face carries the mark of the soul that it hides."

In 2022, her music was used in the theatrical film Niagara.

References

Canadian pop singers
Musicians from Gatineau
French-language singers of Canada
French Quebecers
Juno Award for Francophone Album of the Year winners
Living people
21st-century Canadian women singers
1985 births